The 2012–13 Ligat Nashim was the 15th season of women's league football under the Israeli Football Association.

The league was won by ASA Tel Aviv University, its fourth consecutive title and fifth overall. By winning, ASA Tel Aviv qualified to 2013–14 UEFA Women's Champions League.

Hapoel Be'er Sheva finished bottom of the first division and was relegated to the second division, and was replaced by second division winner, F.C. Kiryat Gat. The second-bottom club in the first division, Bnot Sakhnin met Maccabi Tzur Shalom Bialik for a spot in Ligat Nashim Rishona, Bnot Sakhnin winning 11–0 to remain in the first division.

Ligat Nashim Rishona

Format changes
A promotion/relegation play-off was introduced, setting the second-bottom club in the first division's relegation group against the second-top club in the second division's promotion group.

Regular season

Championship group

Relegation group

Promotion/relegation play-off

Top scorers

Ligat Nashim Shniya

Format changes
As 8 teams registered to the second division, the participating clubs first played a conventional double round-robin schedule for a total of 14 rounds, after which the 4 top clubs played a promotion play-off, while the bottom 4 clubs played a separate play-off, with clubs in each group playing a round-robin schedule of another 3 matches between them. Points earned in the regular season were kept by the clubs. The top club at the Promotion Group would win promotion to Ligat Nashim Rishona, and the second-placed club would compete in a promotion/relegation play-off against the third placed club in the first division's relegation group.

League table

Championship group

Bottom group

Top scorers

References
Ligat Nashim Rishona @IFA
Ligat Nashim Shniya @IFA

Ligat Nashim seasons
1
women
Israel